Purden Lake Provincial Park is a provincial park in British Columbia, Canada. It is located east of Prince George and encompasses the north and east sides of Purden Lake. It was established in August 1971 and covers 2,521 hectares. In 2018, Purden became the first accessible park in British Columbia, adding wheelchair ramps and specialist playground equipment.

A report by BC Parks stated that 45,449 people visited the park in the 2016/17 season, and 52,547 visited it in the 2017/18 season.

References

Provincial parks of British Columbia
1971 establishments in British Columbia
Protected areas established in 1971